Aud Hove (born 5 January 1970) is a Norwegian politician for the Centre Party.

She served as a deputy representative to the Parliament of Norway from Oppland during the terms 2009–2013 and 2017–2021. She first became a member of Skjåk municipal council in 1995, later of Oppland county council, becoming deputy county mayor in 2017.

References

1970 births
Living people
People from Skjåk
Deputy members of the Storting
Centre Party (Norway) politicians
Oppland politicians
Norwegian women in politics
Women members of the Storting